Loïc Guillon (born 11 January 1982) is a French football defender, currently playing for French team Luçon.

Career
Guillon began his career with FC Nantes and joined Vannes OC in July 2009.

References

External links
 
 
 

1982 births
Living people
Association football defenders
French footballers
Ligue 1 players
Ligue 2 players
Championnat National players
FC Nantes players
Vannes OC players
USJA Carquefou players
Angers SCO players
Luçon FC players
USSA Vertou players
Sportspeople from Limoges
Footballers from Nouvelle-Aquitaine